María Estela de la Fuente (born 28 June 1966) is a Mexican politician formerly from the Institutional Revolutionary Party. From 2009 to 2012 she served as Deputy of the LXI Legislature of the Mexican Congress representing Tabasco.

References

1966 births
Living people
Politicians from Tabasco
Women members of the Chamber of Deputies (Mexico)
Institutional Revolutionary Party politicians
21st-century Mexican politicians
21st-century Mexican women politicians
Deputies of the LXI Legislature of Mexico
Members of the Chamber of Deputies (Mexico) for Tabasco